Second Phase of the Revolution (Persian: گام دوم انقلاب) or "Second Step of the Revolution" is a statement that was issued by the supreme leader of Iran, Sayyid Ali Khamenei to the country, particularly to the youth, and was published in February 2019, on the occasion of the fortieth anniversary of the victory of the Iranian Revolution.

In "The second phase of the revolution", also known as "The second phase" or "The second step",  Khamenei expresses the achievements of the last forty years. He presents recommendations toward the goal of "a great Jihad for the sake of making a great Islamic Iran". Khamenei clarifies the issue of "the second step" towards Islamic revolution ideals in seven sections.

In another section of "the second phase of the revolution" statement, it mentions that: (the Islamic revolution) transmitted the spirit and belief of "we can do it" to everybody; and also thanks to the enemies’ sanctions which taught everybody to rely on  its domestic capacities, and likewise it unfolded an origin of great blessings.

Political section
A part of this statement expresses political matters of "the second phase of the revolution"; amongst its parts are about:
 Revolution achievements protection
 Political civilization of the revolution
 Disregard for the capitalist West and the Communist East
 Boredom about officials
 Iran's military defense strategy
 Marxist was not a model for revolution
 The Islamic Revolution tripled world politics
 The revolution democratized the government in Iran
 The security and participation of the people is the fundamental principle of the revolution
 The political vision of the people was enhanced after the revolution
 Dignity, wisdom, and expediency are the three principles of foreign policy

Naming
"Second Phase of the Revolution", is a statement which has been named/mentioned by various titles or definitions -- by diverse Iranian authorities; amongst:

 A golden document for the literature of Islamic revolution epistemic sources

 A practical action, and a route for the progress of Islamic system's goals.

 A strategic statement for the younger generation

 A charter of civilization

 An executive instruction

 A guide and manifesto

 A property and wealth

Etc.

Addressed to the youth 
A part of this statement speech which is addressed to (young) people by Seyyed Ali Khamenei, is as follows: 
"Dear ones! ... Many of what we have seen and experimented, your generation has not experienced and seen yet. We have seen and you will see. The decades ahead are your decades, and it is you who should protect your revolution while you are qualified and full of motivation, and move it closer to its great ideal: that is, the emergence of a new Islamic civilization and the preparation for the rising of the great sun of wilayat ..."

Statement workbook 
According to IBNA (Iran Book News Agency), "Workbook on the Declaration of the Second Step of the Islamic Revolution"; It is a practical document that is related to the statement of the second step of the revolution and has now reached its 16th edition. The main idea of this book is taken from the leader of the Islamic Republic of Iran, and is based on the general geometry of this statement by Ali Khamenei.

Reactions

The President of the Islamic Republic of Iran, Seyyed Ebrahim Ra'isi, calls the statement of the second step of the Islamic Revolution one of the most important upstream documents and documents of change in all parts of the country. He also added: "The second step of the revolution has carefully explained the current situation and the path that must be taken for change." Ra'isi said: "In this statement, the existing truth is well explained and on the other hand, the necessary strategies and measures aimed at reaching the peaks of the new Islamic civilization and a society free from corruption and destruction are also accurately described."

This statement drew reactions and analyses from domestic and foreign authorities. The former president of Iran, Hassan Rouhani, noted that it removes the claims/inductions of the enemies; and emphasized that the government of Iran considers the performance of "the second step" as a priority. Rouhani also expressed that all Iranians must practice it.

The Supreme council of Hawzas, among its decisive support for the statement, has considered the statement in its obligations/goals --in order to operate it out.

Makarem Shirazi, an Iranian Shia Marja', supported the statement during his class performance in Azam mosque of Qom, and named it as a very precise/comprehensive statement which has a strong and applicable program for the next 40 years of the Islamic revolution which can make us powerful in the world/region.

Mohammad-Taqi Mesbah-Yazdi, a former member of the Assembly of Experts on Leadership: "The issuance of this statement is perhaps one of the most difficult tasks that the Supreme Leader of the Revolution has done during his administration, and they have done it in the best possible way under normal circumstances for a human being. "There is a lot more to be done about this statement and its elements, its goals, the interpretations they have used and the guidelines they have given."

See also
 New Islamic Civilization
 (Seyyed Ali Khamenei's letter) "To the Youth in Western Countries"
 To the Youth in Europe and North America

References

External links
The statement of "the second phase of the revolution 
{will be updated soon}

2019 in Iran
Iranian Revolution
Government statements
Ali Khamenei
Political terminology of Iran
Political manifestos